Franco Bolognese (14th century) was an Italian painter, active as a miniature painter (illuminator).

He is said to have trained under Oderisi da Gubbio. In conjunction with that master and Giotto, he was employed by Pope Boniface VIII to illustrate several books, now in the library of the Vatican. Though inferior to Giotto, Dante gives him a higher rank in the Purgatorio (xi. 83). Franco Bolognese was the founder of a school of painters at Bologna, and instructed, amongst others, Vitale da Bologna, Lorenzo, Simone Jacopo, and Cristoforo da Bologna.

In literature
Franco B. is  praised to be better than his teacher, Oderisi, in Divine Comedy by Oderisi himself.

Sources

References

Trecento painters
Italian male painters
Painters from Bologna